George Augustus Webb (6 March 1912 – 30 December 1998) was a British actor, best known for television, including his role as "Daddy", the father of snooty Hyacinth Bucket in the sitcom Keeping Up Appearances.

The son of Henry Augustus Webb (1880–1926) and Gertrude (née Bolingbroke), Webb was born at 41 St Luke's Road, Paddington, London. He had two younger siblings, Denis Alfred (1913–1918), who was killed by a military vehicle at age five while picking flowers for his mother; and Joan (1915–1989), who committed suicide after years of ill health.

From his father's earlier marriage, Webb was the half brother of the actors Rita and Harry Webb. Webb died on 30 December 1998, aged 86, from natural causes.

Filmography

References

External links

George Webb (Aveleyman)

1912 births
1998 deaths
English male television actors
20th-century English male actors